Il vegetale (colloq. "The Loafer") is a 2018 Italian adventure comedy film directed by Gennaro Nunziante, and starring Fabio Rovazzi.

Plot
Fabio Rovazzi is a Milanese graduate of peasant origin in search of work. He is the son of a rich and greedy company owner, Bruno Rovazzi, who despises him and addresses him as an incapable vegetable. Rovazzi tries various trades. He fails at advertising, manual labor and he even fails at farming. After all this, he also loses the girl he loved, so Rovazzi engages in biological farming.

Cast
Fabio Rovazzi as Fabio Rovazzi
Luca Zingaretti as Armando
Katia Mironova as Irina Kusnir
Paola Calliari as Caterina
Antonio Bruschetta as Ninni
Diandra Elettra Moscogiuri as Skater Girl

References

External links 
 

2018 films
Films directed by Gennaro Nunziante
Italian comedy films
2018 comedy films
2010s Italian films